Spatuloricaria lagoichthys is a species of catfish in the family Loricariidae. It is native to South America, where it occurs in the Lake Maracaibo basin in Venezuela. The species reaches 30.6 cm (12 inches) in standard length.

References 

Loricariidae
Species described in 1944
Catfish of South America